Bimbo (also, Bimo) is the capital of Ombella-M'poko, one of the 14 prefectures of the Central African Republic, and is located  by road southwest of the centre of the capital, Bangui. The country's second-largest city, Bimbo had a population of 124,176 as of the 2003 census and a calculated 2013 population of 267,859.

Bimbo is the site of the country's only sex-segregated women's prison, Bimbo Central Prison. The prison was built in 1980 to hold 200 prisoners, although  it only held 44, most of whom were pretrial detainees.

Climate
Köppen-Geiger climate classification system classifies its climate as tropical wet and dry (Aw).

See also
 List of cities in the Central African Republic
 Prefectures of the Central African Republic

References

Sub-prefectures of the Central African Republic
Populated places in Ombella-M'Poko